Devil's Thumb is a pinnacle-shaped,  mountain in the Avannaata municipality in northwestern Greenland.

Geography 

It is a familiar feature for Arctic navigators, similar to the Melville Monument further north, but bigger.

References 

Melville Bay
Mountains of the Upernavik Archipelago